The eastern seaboard of Thailand, more frequently known as the "Eastern Economic Corridor" (EEC), is a developing economic region which plays a key role in Thailand's economy.  It is Thailand's center for export-oriented industries. High value goods, such as Japanese branded automobiles, which are manufactured there and shipped elsewhere, are among the many exports. The region includes Chonburi Province, Chachoengsao Province, and Rayong Province with Samut Prakan Province on the periphery.

Development 
EEC development will cost 1.5 trillion baht in its first five years. The EEC is a key component of the "Thailand 4.0" economic policy announced in 2016. The prime minister has invoked the special powers of Section 44 of the interim charter three times already to remove obstacles to EEC development. Planners see the region as strategically important as it borders the gulf as well as being close to Bangkok, and its major airport.

Laem Chabang port, Thailand's largest and 23rd busiest container port in the world as of 2014, is the region's port. Bangkok, Suvarnabhumi Airport, and the port are all linked by the Bang Na Expressway.

Two large infrastructure projects worth a total of 36 billion baht, both railways, were approved on 23 October 2007, to link Korat and Lat Krabang District in Bangkok with Laem Chabang port.

Thai logistics firm Best Group and the Shenzhen (China) property company Hydoo International have raised US$3 billion to construct a giant financial technology, trade, and logistics centre on a site near Suvarnabhumi Airport. When complete, the centrepiece of the 2.5 square kilometre Trust City World Exhibition and Trade Centre will be a 100,000 m2 exhibition hall. It would be the largest exhibition centre in the world. In addition to an exhibition venue, the project will also accommodate more than 20,000 wholesale shops, 5,000 business-class hotel rooms for traders and tourists, 6,000 less expensive rooms for employees, as well as serviced apartments, and 30,000 parking spaces. The project is expected to be completed by 2020.

Environmental impacts
Serious problems resulting from pollution have plagued the Map Ta Phut Industrial Estate in Rayong, an industrial zone for petrochemical and heavy industries that has suffered from heavy metal and organophosphates poisoning.  Factory workers in the region are among the highest paid in Thailand, often more than physicians in the region, but occasionally suffer physical ailments. A lawsuit filed by local villagers in 2007 led to a cascade of decisions that in 2009 stopped work on many projects under construction for not being in compliance with environmental provisions in the country's new constitution.

References

External links 
 Eastern Economic Corridor Office of Thailand (EECO)

Regions of Thailand
Economy of Thailand
Gulf of Thailand
Industry in Chonburi Province